Diego Ariel Franco Manicero (born 24 May 1985) is an Argentine footballer. His current club is Alianza Universidad.

Honours

Player
Lanus
 Argentine Primera División (1): 2007 Apertura

Sporting Club
 Peruvian Primera División (1): 2015 Descentralizado

Universitario
 Peruvian Primera División (1): 2016 Descentralizado

External links
 Profile at BDFA 
 

1985 births
Living people
Sportspeople from Córdoba Province, Argentina
Argentine footballers
Argentine expatriate footballers
Club Atlético Belgrano footballers
Racing Club de Avellaneda footballers
Club Atlético Lanús footballers
Coquimbo Unido footballers
León de Huánuco footballers
Sporting Cristal footballers
Primera B de Chile players
Argentine Primera División players
Peruvian Primera División players
Expatriate footballers in Chile
Expatriate footballers in Peru
Association football midfielders